Embry (also Gasville) is an unincorporated community in Webster County, Mississippi, United States.

Notable person
United States Senator Thomas Gore of Oklahoma (1870–1949) was born near Embry.

Notes

Unincorporated communities in Webster County, Mississippi
Unincorporated communities in Mississippi